Nicolás Vargas (born 15 September 1992) is a Chilean footballer that currently plays for the Primera B de Chile club Ñublense as defender.

Career

Youth career

Vargas started his career at Primera División de Chile club O'Higgins. He progressed from the under categories club all the way to the senior team.

O'Higgins

Vargas was part of the youth teams of O'Higgins before to be promoted to the first team in 2012 by Eduardo Berizzo. On 2013 is sent on loan to Barnechea, come back for the Apertura 2013-14.

On December 10, 2013, he won the Apertura 2013-14 with O'Higgins and was the captain of team. In the tournament, he played in 11 of 18 matches.

In 2014, he won the Supercopa de Chile against Deportes Iquique, playing the 90 minutes of the match, and failing a penalty in the penalty shoot-out.

He participated with the club in the 2014 Copa Libertadores where they faced Deportivo Cali, Cerro Porteño and Lanús, being third and being eliminated in the group stage.

Honours

Club
O'Higgins
Primera División: Apertura 2013-14
Supercopa de Chile: 2014

Individual

O'Higgins
Medalla Santa Cruz de Triana: 2014

References

External links
 Nicolás Vargas at Football-Lineups
 
 

1992 births
Living people
Chilean footballers
O'Higgins F.C. footballers
Coquimbo Unido footballers
Chilean Primera División players
Association football defenders
People from Rancagua